Renzo Bonazzi (27 January 1925 – 2 April 2010) was an Italian politician and lawyer.

He was a member of the Italian Communist Party. He served as Mayor of Reggio Emilia from 1962 to 1976.

He was elected to the Senate of the Republic from 1976 to 1987 for three legislatures (VII, VIII, IX).

Biography
Renzo Bonazzi was born in Reggio Emilia, Italy in 1925 and died in Reggio Emilia in 2010 at the age of 85. He is married to Marisa Bonazzi.

See also
 List of mayors of Reggio Emilia

References 

1925 births
2010 deaths
People from Reggio Emilia
Italian Communist Party politicians
21st-century Italian politicians
20th-century Italian politicians
Mayors of Reggio Emilia